Martha Haskins, Lady Darwin ( du Puy; July 27, 1861 - 6 February 1947), known as Maud Darwin, was an American socialite and the wife of the English Cambridge University astronomer Sir George Darwin.

Biographical notes 
She was born as Martha Haskins du Puy in 1861 in Pennsylvania, the daughter of Charles Meredith du Puy (1823- 1898), author of A Genealogical History of the DuPuy Family and his wife, Ellen Maria Reynolds, daughter of John Reynolds, an English born clergyman and his wife, Eleanor Evans. Her aunt, Caroline Lane Reynolds, travelled to England and married Richard Claverhouse Jebb. In turn, Maud visited her aunt in Cambridge.  

She rejected twice the marriage proposals of Henry Martyn Taylor. However, while travelling in Italy, she met up with George Darwin, son of the naturalist Charles Darwin, who had commenced his travels independently although he was a member of her social circle, and they became engaged there.

She married Darwin, in 1884 in Erie, Pennsylvania, in an article lavishly described by The New York Times.  The Jebbs were able to join them.

In 1885, they bought Newnham Grange in Cambridge.  They had five children:
 Gwen Raverat (1885–1957), the artist.
 Charles Galton Darwin (1887–1962), the physicist.
 Margaret Elizabeth Darwin (1890–1974), who like her mother was the wife of a Cambridge don, Sir Geoffrey Keynes.
 William Robert Darwin (1894–1970), known as "Billy", a London stockbroker
 Leonard Darwin (born-died 1899)

She became Lady Darwin on her husband's knighthood in 1905; she was widowed in 1912. She died at Newnham Grange in 1947 and was given an obituary in The Times, which noted her campaigning for women police officers. She was cremated at Cambridge Crematorium on February 10, 1947; her husband is buried in Trumpington Extension Cemetery in Cambridge with their daughter Gwen (Raverat); also baby son Leonard Darwin.

Her daughter Gwen's childhood memoir Period Piece contains Maud as a central maternal character, illustrated several times. It also describes her role as the wife of an Oxbridge don. Many of her letters were included in her aunt's biography.  

Her other daughter, Lady Margaret Keynes, also wrote a book containing many references to Maud, this being principally a book about her home, Newnham Grange and its inhabitants. A chapter in Frances Spalding's biography of Gwen Raverat also contains her life story.

References

External links
 

1861 births
1947 deaths
People from Philadelphia
American socialites
American expatriates in England
Darwin–Wedgwood family
Wives of knights